Empress Cao may refer to:

China
These empresses had the surname Cao.
Empress Cao (Han dynasty) (died 260), empress of the Han dynasty
Empress Cao (Dou Jiande's wife) (fl. 621)
Empress Cao (Huang Chao's wife) (died 884)
Empress Dowager Cao (Li Cunxu's mother) (died 925), empress dowager of Later Tang
Empress Cao (Li Siyuan's wife) (died 937), empress of Later Tang
Empress Cao (Song dynasty) (1016–1079), empress of the Song dynasty

Vietnam
These empresses received the posthumous name Empress Cao (Cao Hoàng hậu, ; "High Empress").
Thừa Thiên (empress) (1762–1814), first wife of Emperor Gia Long
Thuận Thiên (Nguyễn dynasty empress) (1769–1846), second wife of Emperor Gia Long

See also
Empress Gao (disambiguation)

Cao